Michael Gough (born December 3, 1956) is an American voice actor. He is known for providing the voices of Deckard Cain in the Diablo series of video games, Gopher in the Winnie the Pooh franchise, The Carmine Brothers in the Gears of War series of video games, the entire Nord race in The Elder Scrolls V: Skyrim, Ulrich Vogel in Call of Duty: Black Ops Cold War, Zorro in The New Adventures of Zorro, Captain James Gordon in Batman: Arkham Origins, Jambalaya Jake in Darkwing Duck, Colonel Spigot inTaleSpin, Osmund Saddler in Resident Evil 4, Officer Pete in Doc McStuffins, Parasite in All-Star Superman, Scarecrow in Tom Jerry and the Wizard of Oz and Shrek in many projects in the franchise where primary voice actor Mike Myers was unavailable.

Filmography

Film
 All-Star Superman – Parasite
 A Winnie the Pooh Thanksgiving – Gopher
 A Very Merry Pooh Year – Gopher
 Boo to You Too! Winnie the Pooh – Gopher
 Batman: Year One – Driver
 Diablo III: Wrath – Deckard Cain
 Far Far Away Idol – Shrek (singing voice)
 Lady and the Tramp II: Scamp's Adventure – Joe
 Little Nemo: Adventures in Slumberland – Teacher #2
 Rocket Power: Race Across New Zealand – Chester McGill
 The Rumpus Machine – Himself
 Scooby-Doo! Legend of the Phantosaur – Mr. Babbit, Blair, Grad Student #1, additional voices
 Seasons of Giving – Gopher
 Shattered Spirits – Fred
 Superman/Batman: Public Enemies – Hawkman, Captain Cold (uncredited)
Tarzan — Samuel
 The Wizard of Speed and Time – Supporting Cast
 Tom and Jerry and the Wizard of Oz – The Scarecrow, Hunk
 Tom and Jerry: Back to Oz – The Scarecrow, Hunk
 Winnie the Pooh: 123's – Gopher
 Winnie the Pooh: A Valentine for You – Gopher
 Winnie the Pooh: Franken Pooh – Gopher

Television 
 Adventures from the Book of Virtues – Abraham Lincoln (Episode: Honor")
 Aladdin – Kapok's Guard, Musician (Episode: "Heads, You Lose")
 Ben 10 – Lt. Steel, SACT Member #2
 Ben & Izzy – Lysippos (Episode: "The Mane Event")
 Bonkers - Additional voices
 Chalkzone – Daddy O'Possum 
 Danny Phantom – Sampson (Episode: "One of a Kind")
 Darkwing Duck – Jambalaya Jake, Cowboy Doug
 Disney's House of Mouse – Gopher
 Doc McStuffins – Officer Pete, Gopher
 Duck Dodgers – Captain Glosterman, Professor, Reporter
 Famous 5: On the Case – Kevin Campbell
 Fatherhood – Coach VanderGroverGrover
 Goof Troop – Fester Swollen (5 episodes) 
 I Am Weasel – Admiral Bullets, Carl, additional voices
 Jackie Chan Adventures – Detective Le Foo, Gray Fox (Episode: "Origami")
 James Bond Jr. – Spoiler
 Johnny Bravo – Peter the Horse, Grown Man, Old Man (Episode: "Johnny Bravo Meets Adam West/Under the Big Flop/Johnny Bravo Meets Donny Osmond")
 Justice League – Professor Henry Moss, Security Guard (Episode: "A Knight of Shadows: Part 1")
 Invasion America – Additional voices
 Max Steel – Grimsley (Episode: "Extreme")
 Men in Black: The Series – Cosmosis, Henry Dribble, Scrawny (Episode: "The Zero to Superhero Syndrome")
 My Life as a Teenage Robot – Bunny, Fatty, Man #2 (Episode: "Shell Game") 
 Oh Yeah! Cartoons – Max's Boss
 Rocket Power – RoBattle Announcer, Singer, Robinator
 Rocket Power: Race Across New Zealand – Chester McGill
 TaleSpin – Colonel Spigot (8 episodes)
 Teenage Mutant Ninja Turtles – Raphael (in the final season, following Rob Paulsen's departure from the role), Red Alien, Hitech
 The Angry Beavers – Hosan, Master Ng
 The Emperor's New School – Imatcho (Episode: "The Bride of Kuzco") 
 The Grim Adventures of Billy & Mandy – CIA Agent #6, CIA Agent #7, Sea Critter, Announcer, Guy Golfer, TV Dad, Chef, Painter, Geek, Daisy the Chupacabra
 The Legend of Prince Valiant – Will, Garth, Servant
 The Little Mermaid – Kid Squid (Episode: "Stormy") 
 The New Adventures of Winnie the Pooh – Gopher
 The New Adventures of Speed Racer - Speed Racer, Foreman
 The New Adventures of Zorro – Zorro/Don Diego de la Vega
 The PJs – Jackie Chan (Episode: "The Last Affirmative Action Hero")
 The Wild Thornberrys – Rwiti Himona (Episode: "Hot Air")
 Time Squad – George Washington, Freud's Patient, Paul Revere's Father, Dr. Livingstone
 Timon & Pumbaa – Zazu
 Totally Spies! – Tim Scam
 We Bare Bears – Dr. Bean (Episode: "Money Man")
 What's New, Scooby-Doo? – Drill Sergeant Payne, MP #2
 W.I.T.C.H. – Oracle, Althor, Bouncer, R.C., Werewolf

Video games
 Aion – Additional voices
 Ape Escape 3 – Monkey Blue (NTSC-U version)
 Ape Escape Academy – Monkey Blue, Pipotron Blue (NTSC-U version)
 Arcanum: Of Steamworks and Magick Obscura – Franklin Payne
 Area 51 – Additional voices
 Assassin's Creed II – Florentine Guardsman, additional voices
 Assassin's Creed: Brotherhood – Additional voices 
 Assassin's Creed: Revelations – Additional voices 
 Baldur's Gate – Husam, Krestor, Marek
 Baldur's Gate II: Shadows of Amn – Solaufein
 Batman: Arkham City – Doctor, TYGER Guards, Gotham Cop
 Batman: Arkham Origins – GCPD Captain James Gordon
 Batman: Arkham Origins Blackgate – GCPD Captain James Gordon
 Bee Movie Game – Harry Beeman, Honey Scientist, Male Bee
 Blaster Learning System series
 Math Blaster Ages 5-7 – Mel
 Math Blaster Ages 6-8 – Mel
 Math Blaster Ages 7-9 – Mel
 Reading Blaster Ages 4-6 – Mel
 Reading Blaster Ages 5-7 – Mel
 Reading Blaster Ages 6-8 – Mel
 Call of Duty series
 Call of Duty – Captain Price
 Call of Duty 2 – Captain Price
 Call of Duty: Black Ops Cold War – Ulrich Vogel
 Champions: Return to Arms – Additional voices
 Crash Bandicoot: On the Run! - Gnasty Gnorc
 Crash Team Racing Nitro-Fueled - N. Trance, Gnasty Gnorc, additional voices
 Diablo series
 Diablo – Deckard Cain, Sorcerer
 Diablo II – Deckard Cain
 Diablo II: Lord of Destruction – Deckard Cain
 Diablo III – Deckard Cain
 Diablo III: Reaper of Souls – Deckard Cain
 Disney's Villains' Revenge – Prince Charming, Playing Cards
 Doom 3 – E. Grafton, additional voices
 Dragon Age: Origins – Wise Elf, Male, additional voices
 Duckman: The Graphic Adventures of a Private Dick – Eric T. Duckman
 Eternal Sonata – Doctor, Royal Official, Magic Researcher (as Well Hoyle)
 EverQuest II – Thardrin Steeleye, Lt. Laughlin, Dword Soulforge, Dibble Rootweaver, Generic Racial Dark Elf, Generic Racial Troll, Generic Racial Ogre, Generic Racial Human, Generic Racial Kerra, Generic Racial Barbarian, Generic Racial Half Elf, Generic Racial Erudite, Generic Racial Gnome, Generic Racial Iksar, Generic Racial Ratonga
 Fallout 76: Wastelanders – Kieran Kennedy, Reginald "Regs" Stone, James Duncan
 Fallout Tactics: Brotherhood of Steel – Additional Voices
 Final Fantasy XIII – Cocoon Inhabitants
 Final Fantasy XIV – Various voices
 Freddy Pharkas: Frontier Pharmacist – Kenny the Kid, Salvatore O'Hanrahan
 Gears of War series
Gears of War – Anthony Carmine
 Gears of War 2 – Benjamin Carmine
 Gears of War 3 – Clayton Carmine
 Gears of War: Judgment – Clayton Carmine
Gears of War: Ultimate Edition – Anthony Carmine (Benjamin Carmine and Clayton Carmine - part of set) 
Gears of War 4 
Gears 5 - Clayton Carmine
 G-Force – Speckles
 Gothic 3 – Additional voices
 Gurumin: A Monstrous Adventure – Hyperbolic, Giga
 Herc's Adventures – Hercules, Dionysus
 Heroes of the Storm – Deckard Cain, Tassadar, Mal'Ganis
 Judgment - Yoji Shono
 JumpStart Adventures 3rd Grade: Mystery Mountain – Dog
 JumpStart Typing – Male Voiceover, Coach Qwerty
 Killer7 – Dan Smith
 Kingdom Hearts II – Gopher
 Kingdom Hearts II: Final Mix+ – Gopher 
 Kingdom Hearts III – Gopher  
 Kingdoms of Amalur: Reckoning – Arthagall, Captain Pedwyn, Edgar Aron, additional voices
 King's Quest – Larry, Wente Fey
 Lego Jurassic World – Additional voices
 Leisure Suit Larry: Love for Sail! – Jacques, Willy, Xqwzts
 Lightning Returns: Final Fantasy XIII – Additional voices
 Lost Odyssey – Narrator
 Lost Planet 2 – Additional voices
 Madagascar Kartz – Shrek
 Mafia: Definitive Edition – Finn Harrington, Police 
 Marvel: Ultimate Alliance – MODOK, Shocker, Piledriver
 Men of Valor – Schiffer, Aussie #2, Pilot #1, White Marine #1
 Metal Gear series
 Metal Gear Solid 2: Sons of Liberty – Russian Soldier
 Metal Gear Solid 3: Snake Eater – Johnny, Soldiers
 Metal Gear Solid 4: Guns of the Patriots – Narrator, Werewolf
 Middle-earth: Shadow of Mordor – Nemesis Orcs
 Murdered: Soul Suspect – Additional voices
 Open Season – McSquizzy
 Over the Hedge – Rufus, Theme Park Owner, Tiger
 Piglet's Big Game – Gopher
 Predator: Concrete Jungle – Additional voices
 Project Snowblind – PFC John Walker
 Resident Evil 4 – Osmund Saddler
 Rise of the Argonauts – Hermes, Demelion, Centaur
 Robots – Fender 
 Samurai Western – Gunman #1, Gunman #5, Group Leader #2
 Saints Row: The Third – Pedestrian and Character Voices
 Shadow of Rome – Narclastese, additional voices
 Shark Tale – Paparazzo Fish, additional voices
 Shrek series
 Shrek – Shrek
 Shrek 2 – Shrek, King Harold, Knight, Peasant
 Shrek the Third – Shrek, Announcer
 Shrek Forever After – Shrek 
 Shrek Smash n' Crash Racing – Shrek 
 Shrek's Carnival Craze – Shrek, Puppet Singers
 Sly Cooper: Thieves in Time – Crane Guard
 Soldier of Fortune II: Double Helix – Additional voices
 Spider-Man 3 – Additional voices
 Spyro: A Hero's Tail – Gnasty Gnorc, The Professor, Sgt. Byrd
 Spyro the Dragon – Gnasty Gnorc, various characters
 Spyro Reignited Trilogy – Gnasty Gnorc 
 StarCraft – Tassadar
 Soviet Strike – Bessus
 Star Trek: Deep Space Nine: The Fallen – Chief Miles O' Brien, Obsidian Order Male, Bajoran Monk
 Star Trek: Klingon Academy – Civil War Engineer, Battlestation Commander
 Star Wars: Galactic Battlegrounds – Airspeeder Pilot, Battle Droid, Rebel Hovercraft Captain, Sith Knight, Fast Bike Driver, Zalor Minister
 Star Wars: Knights of the Old Republic – Largo, Hendar
 Star Wars Knights of the Old Republic II: The Sith Lords – Berun Modrul, Bralor, additional voices
 Summoner 2 – Medevan Knight
 Superman Returns – The Citizens of Metropolis
 Tak: The Great Juju Challenge – JuJu Challenge Host
 The Bard's Tale - Additional voices
 The Elder Scrolls V: Skyrim – Acolyte Jenssen, Alvor, Arnskar Ember-Master, Balgruuf the Greater, Barknar, Beirand, Belrand, Bersi Honey-Hand, Bolund, Brunwulf Free-Winter, Calder, Falk Firebeard, Filnjar, Fultheim the Fearless, Golldir, Gorm, Hadring, Hafnar Ice-Fist, Heimskr, Hjorunn, Hod, Hunroor, Jon Battle-Born, Jorn, Kjar, Kjeld, Korir, Kraldar, Kust, Kyr, Lodvar, Lortheim, Lucky Lorenz, Odar, Oengul War-Anvil, Ogmund, Pactur, Phantom, Ralis Sedarys, Ralof, Rissing, Roggi Knot-Beard, Roggvir, Skaggi Scar-Face, Skulvar Sable-Hilt, Sond, Svaknir, Talsgar the Wanderer, Thalmor Prisoner, Thjollod, Thongvor Silver-Blood, Thonnir, Thorek, Thorgar, Torkild the Fearsome, Ulfgar the Unending, Vekel the Man, Viding, Vilkas, Vilod, Vipir the Fleet, Vulwulf Snow-Shod, Wilhelm
 The Elder Scrolls Online – Shalidor
 The Golden Compass – Lord Faa, Gyptian Hunter, Injured Sailor
 The Last of Us – Additional voices
 The Lord of the Rings: The Battle for Middle-earth II: The Rise of the Witch-king – Black Numenoreans
 The Matrix: Path of Neo – Seraph, Agent Brown, Vamp
 The Mummy Returns – Ardeth
 The Punisher – Martin Soap
 The Saboteur – Additional voices
 Titantic Explorer – Jack Thayer, Francis Dyke, Frank Prentice, Arthur Lewis, James Paintin
 Tonka series
 Tonka Construction – Tonka Joe
 Tonka Construction 2 – Tonka Joe
 Tonka Search & Rescue – Tonka Joe
 Tonka Rescue Patrol – Tonka Joe
 Tonka Garage – Tonka Joe
 Tonka Workshop – Tonka Joe
 Tonka Raceway – Tonka Joe
 Tonka Dig'n Rigs – Tonka Joe
 Tonka Space Station – Tonka Joe
 Too Human – Aesir Officer, Beserker, Human Aide, Heimdall
 Travis Strikes Again: No More Heroes – Electro Triple Star, Dan Smith, News Caster 
 Treasure Planet: Battle at Procyon – Canid Captain, Canid Crew, Commander
 True Crime: Streets of LA – Additional voices
 Uncharted 2: Among Thieves – Serbian Soldiers
 Uncharted 3: Drake's Deception – Serbian Soldier
 Uncharted 4: A Thief's End -  Shoreline Mercenary
 Vampire: The Masquerade – Bloodlines – additional voices
 Viewtiful Joe 2 – Big John
 Viewtiful Joe: Red Hot Rumble – Big John
 Winnie the Pooh's Rumbly Tumbly Adventure – Gopher
 Xenosaga Episode II: Jenseits von Gut und Böse – Jin Uzuki, Vector Staff
 Xenosaga Episode III: Also sprach Zarathustra – Jin Uzuki, Aizen Magus
 X-Men Legends – Soldier #3, various voices

References

External links
 
 
 

1956 births
20th-century American male actors
21st-century American male actors
American male video game actors
American male voice actors
Audiobook narrators
Living people
Male actors from San Jose, California